Michal Šmíd (born 20 October 1986) is a professional Czech football player who currently plays for reserve team of SK Slavia Prague.

Career
Šmíd joined SK Dynamo České Budějovice in the summer of 2007, having played youth football for SK Slavia Prague. On 3 September 2019 he joined FC Zbrojovka Brno on a half year loan from Bohemians 1905.

References

External links
 
 Guardian Football

Czech footballers
1986 births
Living people
Czech National Football League players
Czech First League players
SK Dynamo České Budějovice players
FK Dukla Prague players
Bohemians 1905 players
FC Zbrojovka Brno players
SK Slavia Prague players

Association football defenders